5th Gaumee Film Awards ceremony, honored the best Maldivian films released between 2006 and 2007. The ceremony was held on 12 April 2008.

Winners and nominees

Main awards
Nominees were announced in April 2008.

Technical awards

Short film

See also
 Gaumee Film Awards

References

Gaumee Film Awards
2008 film awards
2008 in the Maldives
April 2008 events in Asia